Susan Elizabeth Rotolo (November 20, 1943 – February 25, 2011), known as Suze Rotolo, was an American artist, and the girlfriend of Bob Dylan from 1961 to 1964. Dylan later acknowledged her strong influence on his music and art during that period. Rotolo is the woman walking with him on the cover of his 1963 album The Freewheelin' Bob Dylan, a photograph by the Columbia Records studio photographer Don Hunstein. In her book A Freewheelin' Time: A Memoir of Greenwich Village in the Sixties, Rotolo described her time with Dylan and other figures in the folk music and bohemian scene in Greenwich Village, New York. She discussed her upbringing as a "red diaper" baby—a child of Communist Party USA members during the McCarthy Era. As an artist, she specialized in artists' books and taught at the Parsons School of Design in New York City.

Biography

The Freewheelin' years, 1961–1964

Rotolo, of Italian-American descent, was born at Brooklyn Jewish Hospital, New York, and raised in Sunnyside, Queens. Her parents were Joachim and Mary (née Pezzati) Rotolo, who were members of the American Communist Party. In June, 1960, she graduated from Bryant High School.

At about the time she met Dylan, Rotolo began working full-time as a political activist in the office of the Congress of Racial Equality (CORE), and the anti-nuclear group SANE. She and her sister Carla had also entered the Greenwich Village folk scene. Rotolo first met Dylan at a Riverside Church folk concert in July 1961. They were introduced by Carla, who at that time was working as an assistant to folklorist Alan Lomax. Describing their meeting in his memoir, Chronicles, Volume One, Dylan wrote:

It was not until they met that Dylan's writing began to address issues such as the civil rights movement and the threat of nuclear war. They started living together in early 1962, much to the disapproval of her family. As Dylan's fame grew, Rotolo found the relationship increasingly stressful. She wrote:

Rotolo left New York in June 1962, with her mother, to spend six months studying art at the University of Perugia in Italy. She was known there as Justine Rotolo, having used an invented middle name to register as "S. Justine Rotolo". Dylan's separation from his girlfriend has been credited as the inspiration  behind several of his finest love songs, including "Don't Think Twice, It's Alright", "Tomorrow Is a Long Time", "One Too Many Mornings", and "Boots of Spanish Leather".

Rotolo's political views were widely regarded as having influenced Dylan's topical songwriting. Dylan also credited her with interesting him in the French poet Arthur Rimbaud, who heavily influenced his writing style. The influence of Bertolt Brecht on Dylan's songwriting has also been acknowledged by Dylan as stemming from Rotolo's participation in Brechtian theater during their relationship. In Chronicles, Dylan describes the impact of the song "Pirate Jenny" while attending a Brecht show on which Rotolo worked. Dylan's interest in painting can also be traced back to his relationship with Rotolo, who had emphasized her shared values with Dylan in an interview with author Robbie Woliver:

Rotolo became pregnant in 1963 by Dylan and had an abortion. Their relationship failed to survive the abortion, Dylan's affair with Joan Baez, and the hostility of the Rotolo family. Suze moved into her sister's apartment in August 1963. She and Dylan broke up in 1964, in circumstances which Dylan described in his "Ballad in Plain D". Twenty years later he apologized for the song, saying: "I must have been a real schmuck to write that. I look back at that particular one and say, of all the songs I've written, maybe I could have left that alone."

Later life and death, 1964–2011
Rotolo traveled to Cuba in June 1964, with a group, although it was unlawful for United States citizens to do so. She was quoted as saying, in regard to opponents of Fidel Castro that, "These gusanos [worms] are not suppressed. There can be open criticism of the regime. As long as they keep it to talk they are tolerated, as long as there is no sabotage."

Rotolo married Italian Enzo Bartoccioli, a film editor who worked for the United Nations, in 1967. Together they had one son, Luca, who is a guitarist in New York. In New York, Rotolo worked as an illustrator and painter, before concentrating on creating book art, things resembling books but incorporating found objects. Remaining politically active, Rotolo joined the street-theater group Billionaires for Bush and protested at the 2004 Republican National Convention in Manhattan.

Rotolo avoided discussing her relationship with Dylan for decades. In July 2004, she was interviewed in a documentary produced by New York PBS Channel 13 and The New York Daily News. In November 2004, she made an unannounced appearance at the Experience Music Project, on a panel discussing Dylan's early days in Greenwich Village. She and her husband also were involved in putting on a memorial event for Dave van Ronk after the singer's death in 2002. Rotolo made an appearance in Martin Scorsese's documentary film, No Direction Home: Bob Dylan, which focused on Dylan's early career from 1961 to 1966. This film was broadcast as part of the American Masters series on PBS public television in September 2005. Rotolo was also interviewed nationally in 2008 by Terry Gross on NPR's Fresh Air to promote her book, A Freewheelin' Time: A Memoir of Greenwich Village in the Sixties, which was published by Broadway Books on May 13, 2008. Rotolo recounted her attempts not to be overshadowed by her relationship with Dylan. She discussed her need to pursue her artistic creativity and to retain her political integrity, concluding:

The image of Rotolo walking with Dylan on the cover of The Freewheelin' Bob Dylan proved impossible to shake off, but equally difficult to accept. The New York Times, reviewing her book, observed that

The Guardian, too, notes that Rotolo is defined as "the girl with the wistful eyes and hint of a smile whose head is resting on the suede-jacketed shoulder of a nice-looking young man as they trudge through the snow on the cover of 1963's The Freewheelin' Bob Dylan." The review agrees with the New York Timess comment ("a disconnected list")  that the book is "oddly organised", but at once adds "though not as random as it seems". Nathalie Rothschild, writing in The Guardian after Rotolo's death, noted that Rotolo had worked hard to escape the epithets of "Bob Dylan's muse" and "the girl on the front cover of The Freewheelin' Bob Dylan", insisting in her memoir that she had been more than "a string on Dylan's guitar".

Rotolo died of lung cancer at her home in New York City's NoHo neighborhood on February 25, 2011, aged 67.

Film portrayals
In the 2007 film I'm Not There, a fictional account of Bob Dylan's life, there is a version of Rotolo's relationship with Dylan. Heath Ledger plays Robbie Clark, one of six Dylan-based characters in the film. Charlotte Gainsbourg plays Claire, the wife of Robbie. This character has been described as a combination of Sara Dylan, Dylan's first wife, and Suze Rotolo. In the film, Robbie meets Claire in a Greenwich Village diner and they fall in love. The scene in which Robbie and Claire run romantically through the streets of New York re-enacts the cover of the 1963 album The Freewheelin' Bob Dylan.

Notes

References

External links 
 
 Rotolo's work on Paperworks Website
 Obituary in The New York Times
 Fresh Air interview, 2008
 FBI Tracking of Bob Dylan and Suze Rotolo Foreshadowed Future Abuses, Published in Truthout

1943 births
2011 deaths
American people of Italian descent
University of Perugia alumni
Writers from Manhattan
People from Queens, New York
People from Greenwich Village
Bob Dylan
Deaths from lung cancer in New York (state)